Welbourn is a village and civil parish in the North Kesteven district of Lincolnshire, England. The population of the civil parish at the 2011 census was 647. To the east lies the course of Ermine Street, now the Viking Way.

The name 'Welbourn' derives from the Old English wella-burna meaning 'stream with a spring'.

The village church is St Chad's, part of the Loveden Deanery of the Diocese of Lincoln. The village public house is the Joiners Arms.

At Castle Hill to the north of the village are the earthwork remains of Welbourn Castle, a medieval ringwork.  The site was purchased in 1998 by Welbourn Parish Council, with the help of a grant from the Heritage Memorial Fund, and is now maintained as a scheduled monument and community open space.

In 1598 Francis Trigge, Rector of Welbourn, arranged for a library to be set up in the room over the south porch of St Wulfram's Church, Grantham for the use of the clergy and the inhabitants of the town; the Francis Trigge Chained Library is claimed as the first public library. The anti-slavery campaigner and academic Peter Peckard was born in the village, the son of the Rev. John Peckard. Field Marshal Sir William Robertson, who served in the First World War, was born in Welbourn. The village secondary school, Sir William Robertson Academy, is named after Robertson.

Saperton
The village is associated with the site of the lost settlement of Saperton.  The exact location of the site is unknown.

There is self-catering accommodation at Hilltop Farm on the Cliff Edge overlooking the village but no accommodation in the village itself

References

External links

 William Robertson High School

Villages in Lincolnshire
Civil parishes in Lincolnshire
North Kesteven District